Catherine Thomas (born in 1963) is a Welsh politician and former Labour Welsh Assembly Member for the constituency of Llanelli. She narrowly beat Helen Mary Jones of Plaid Cymru at the 2003 Assembly election with a majority of 21. Helen Mary Jones defeated her in the 2007 election. She was married to the MP for Caerphilly Wayne David.

Education
University of Glamorgan (now the University of South Wales) and the University of Wales, Cardiff.

Professional career
Former environmental co-ordinator. Board member of a housing association and member of Children in Wales.

Political career
Aide to Julie Morgan MP, 1997–2003. Welsh Assembly Member for the constituency of Llanelli 2003–07.

References

External links
Welsh Labour Party Website

Offices held

1963 births
Living people
Alumni of the University of Glamorgan
Alumni of Cardiff University
Welsh Labour members of the Senedd
Wales AMs 2003–2007